Cogley Island is an alluvial island in the Allegheny River in North Buffalo Township, Armstrong County in the U.S. state of Pennsylvania. The island is situated across from Ford City and Manorville boroughs.

The elevation of Cogley Island is 768 feet above sea level.

References

External links
U.S. Army Corps of Engineers navigation charts

River islands of Pennsylvania
Islands of the Allegheny River in Pennsylvania
Landforms of Armstrong County, Pennsylvania